Viruthan Shanku is a 1968 Indian Malayalam-language comedy film directed by P. Venu, starring Adoor Bhasi and Ambika. It revolves around Vikraman, and how he tricks people and steals their valuables in a comic way and also how he wins the heart of Kunjikkavu.

Plot 
The film starts with Vikraman returning home from Madras after completing his studies. On reaching his Tharavad he understands that his elder brother moved out of their house after marrying a young woman and is now under the control of his mother-in-law. He is also controlling all the wealth of the Tharavad, leaving their sister, who is a widow, and her three daughters in poverty. Vikraman went and asked his brother for money, but he refused to give them any money. Vikraman filed a court case for share in the property. Vikraman is married and his wife and his young son are at his wife's house. He went to visit them. Meanwhile, his wife and child were attacked by a dacoit. In the resultant struggle, she was pushed from the attic by the dacoit and the child was abducted for the gold he was wearing. She died in the arms of Vikraman, who had just arrived. He got a broken piece of a tiger's claw belonging to the dacoit as evidence, which broke during the struggle. Soon Vikraman learns that he is affected with Tuberculosis and left home, carrying his gun, in order to save his sister and her daughters from the disease. He felt unconscious in the forest and was saved by the tribals. His disease was cured by them using their traditional Ayurvedic medicines. On regaining health, Vikraman kills an elephant which was troubling the tribal men. To save the tribals from the Forest officials, Vikraman left them and entered deep jungle. There he was caught by the dacoits, and from the broken tiger's claw in the pendant of a dacoit, Vikraman recognised the one who killed his wife and abducted his child. He was taken before the chief of the dacoits with whom Vikraman's child was safe. Vikraman told him all that happened in his life and how his men ruined his life. The chief ordered his trusted lieutenant to investigate whether Vikraman is telling the truth. Based on the investigation, the chief realised that his gang member actually is responsible for the death of Vikraman's wife and expelled him from the gang. But, since Vikraman is aware of their hideout, he didn't let Vikraman return with his child. Instead he asked him to join their gang and prove that he is trustworthy so that he can release his child. Vikraman accepted the offer and joined the gang.

Vikraman was asked to prove himself as a smart thief by the chief. He also directed his men to observe Vikraman. Vikraman started to trick people by using various disguises. He disguised himself as an old Brahmin, a washerman, a cloth seller, etc. He stole a diamond ring, expensive silk clothes, a gold necklace, a bicycle, a horse and more. He adopted the name "Shanku". Meanwhile, the dacoits visited Vikraman's elder brother and punished him for not caring for his sister and family and make him promise to take care of them in the future. He understood his mistake and returned to his sister and family to look after them. Shanku went to the house of a senior advocate and tricked his wife and his sister Kunjikkavu and stole their gold chain, silk clothes and even their house key. Shanku on seeing Kunjikkavu instantly fell in love with her. Even though fooled, Kunjikkavu developed and admiration towards Shanku and gradually fell in love. Shanku successfully completed his task and the dacoit chief let Shanku return his son back to his home. After that, Shanku returned all the items he stole to their respective owners. Then, Shanku disguised himself as a Carnatic music teacher and took up the role of Kunjikkavu's music teacher. Even Kunjikkavu didn't realise that the teacher is Shanku. Meanwhile, he tried to understand Kunjikkavu's mind and told her his life story. Hearing all that, Kunjikkavu told Shanku that she too loves him. Then an old and rich Brahmin came to marry Kunjikkavu. Her brother and sister in law agreed for the proposal even though Kunjikkavu sternly opposed it. In the meantime, the expelled dacoit shot the chief and tried to take over as the chief of the gang. But Shanku brought the injured chief to the scene and he killed the rebel dacoit. Before he dies, the chief proclaims Shanku the new chief. But Shanku wants the dacoits to lead a normal life and dissolved the gang. Then Shanku with the help of fellow dacoits threatened the groom and made him flee to Kasi. Then Shanku as music teacher stepped in and offered to marry Kunjikkavu to avoid the embarrassment of having the marriage cancelled. But, Kunjikkavu opposed this proposal also and announced openly that she will only marry Shanku. Then Shanku removed the disguise of the music teacher and revealed who he is. In the end, with the consent and blessing of all their relatives, Shanku and Kunjikkavu got married.

Cast 
Adoor Bhasi as Vikraman/Shanku
Thikkurissy Sukumaran Nair as Menon
Kottarakkara Sreedharan Nair as Ukkannan Unni Nair
Ambika Sukumaran as Kunjikkavu
Jayabharathi as Kamakshi
Shankaradi as Naanu
Muthukulam Raghavan Pillai as Forest Officer
Balan C. A. as Vettakkaran Abdulla Sahib
Panjabi as Hanuman Pandaram Swami
Kottayam Santha as Naanukuttyamma
P. K. Sathyapal as Chief of the dacoits
T. K. Balachandran as Kittunnu
Kaduvakulam Antony as Krishnan
Pappukkutty Bhagavathar as Chithran Namboothiri
T. R. Omana as Kalyani
Meenakumari as Bhargavi
Vanchiyoor Radha as Kumudam
Khadeeja as Ichikkavu
Aranmula Ponnamma as Kunjulakhsmi
Sukumari as Parukuttyamma
C. R. Parthiban as Son-in-law of old Brahmin (Diamond ring, Tamil-speaking)
P. A. Thomas as Velu Menon
Thodupuzha Radhakrishnan as Kunjikrishna Panikkar

Soundtrack 
The music is given by B. A. Chidambaranath. The lyrics are by P. Bhaskaran.  The background score is given by Joseph Krishna.

References

External links 
 

1960s heist films
1960s Malayalam-language films
1968 films
1968 romantic comedy films
Films directed by P. Venu
Indian black-and-white films
Indian heist films
Indian romantic comedy films